The Rochester Cardinals were a professional ice hockey team that was a member of the International Hockey League. The Cardinals, who played at Edgerton Park Arena, lasted only the 1935–36 season, compiling a 15–29–3 record and a host of financial difficulties.

The Cardinals were a farm team of the New York Americans of the National Hockey League. Rochester could have been a charter member of the International-American Hockey League which formed in the summer of 1936 upon the merger of the IHL and the Canadian-American Hockey Leagues. However, the Cardinals went into receivership before the end of the 1935–36 season and no suitable owner could be found to operate the team.

After a new arena was constructed Rochester was awarded the Rochester Americans.

References

External links
 Team profile at Hockeydb.com

International Hockey League (1929–1936) teams
New York Americans minor league affiliates
Defunct ice hockey teams in the United States
Defunct sports teams in New York (state)
Cardinals
1935 establishments in New York (state)
1936 disestablishments in New York (state)
Ice hockey clubs established in 1935
Sports clubs disestablished in 1936